All the Best Songs is a compilation album by the American punk rock band No Use for a Name, released July 10, 2007 through Fat Wreck Chords. A "best of" album, it compiles 24 tracks from the band's six studio releases between 1993 and 2005, as well as two previously unreleased songs recorded during sessions for their 2005 album Keep Them Confused. Following the 2012 death of band leader Tony Sly, Fat Wreck Chords released an updated version of the album in 2016, dropping the two Keep Them Confused outtakes and adding four tracks from the band's final studio album, 2008's The Feel Good Record of the Year.  The Keep them Confused outtakes were later released on the b-sides compilation Rarities Vol. 2: The Originals

Release
No Use for a Name supported the album with a headlining West Coast tour, with support from Whole Wheat Bread and the Flatliners.

Reception
Reviewing the album for AllMusic, Jo-Ann Greene rated it 4 stars out of 5, calling it "a grand retrospective of the high points of their Fat years."

Track listing
Credits adapted from the album's liner notes.

Personnel
Credits adapted from the album's liner notes.

Band
 Tony Sly – guitar, lead vocals
 Rory Koff – drums
 Robin Pfefer – lead guitar on tracks from The Daily Grind
 Ed Gregor – lead guitar on tracks from ¡Leche con Carne!
 Chris Shiflett – lead guitar and backing vocals on tracks from Making Friends, Life in the Fat Lane, and More Betterness!
 Dave Nassie – lead guitar on tracks from Hard Rock Bottom, Keep Them Confused, and The Feel Good Record of the Year
 Steve Papoutsis – bass guitar on tracks from The Daily Grind and ¡Leche con Carne!
 Matt Riddle – bass guitar and backing vocals on tracks from Making Friends, Life in the Fat Lane, More Betterness!, Hard Rock Bottom, Keep Them Confused, and The Feel Good Record of the Year

Additional performers
 Karina Denike – additional vocals on "On the Outside"
 Dicky Barrett – additional vocals on "Growing Down"
 Spike Slawson – backing vocals on "Chasing Rainbows"
 Rebekah Scott – cello on "Not Your Savior" and "Let It Slide"
 Jennifer Walker – cello on "Let Me Down"
 Dana Lynn – violin on "Let It Slide"

Production
 All tracks produced by Ryan Greene and No Use for a Name, except:
 "Feeding the Fire" produced by Steve Papoutsis and Karl H.
 "Permanent Rust" and "The Daily Grind" produced by Pat Coughlin, Fat Mike, and Donnell Cameron
 Tracks from ¡Leche con Carne! produced by Fat Mike, Ryan Greene, and No Use for a Name
 Tracks from The Feel Good Record of the Year produced and engineered by Bill Stevenson and Jason Livermore, with additional engineering by Andrew Berlin and Jason Allen
 Tardon Feathered – tape transfers, mastering
 Jason Livermore – digital remastering

Artwork and design
 Brian Archer – layout, front cover and interior photographs
 Matt Riddle – back cover photograph
 Additional interior photographs by Scott Cole, Kate Powers, Marina Miller, Brian Wynacht, Winni Wintermeyer, Lisa Johnson, BJ Papas, Murray Bowles, and Chris McCaw

References

External links
 Fat Wreck Site

No Use for a Name albums
2007 greatest hits albums
Fat Wreck Chords compilation albums